is a Japanese voice actress and singer from Tokushima Prefecture, Japan. She was a member of Wake Up, Girls!.

Biography

Filmography

Anime
2014
Wake Up, Girls! as Nanami Hisami
Dramatical Murder as Female A (ep 5)
Hanayamata as Student (eps 5–6)
Re:_Hamatora as Child B (ep 8)
When Supernatural Battles Became Commonplace as Chifuyu Himeki
PriPara as Girl (ep 20)
Trinity Seven as Master Liber
Ohenro as Mao

2015
The Idolmaster Cinderella Girls as Yui Ōtsuki (eps 10, 20, 22)
Battle Spirits: Burning Soul as Kanna Kuroda
Rin-Ne as Girl
Hacka Doll The Animation as Hacka Doll #3
Mr. Osomatsu as Nyaa Hashimoto, Woman (ep 13)

2016
KonoSuba as Rookie Succubus (ep 9)
High School Fleet as Tsugumi Yagi
Hundred as Wendy Velvet
Magi: Adventure of Sinbad as Girl B (ep 11)
Puzzle & Dragons X as Garnet
PriPara as Pepper Taiyō

2017
Grimoire of Zero as Girl's younger brother (ep 4)
Idol Time PriPara as Pepper Taiyō, Komugi Udongawa
Wake Up, Girls! New Chapter as Nanami Hisami
In Another World with My Smartphone as Sushie Ernea Ortlinde
Mr. Osomatsu 2 as Nyaa Hashimoto
Restaurant to Another World as Magician (ep 10)
The Idolmaster Cinderella Girls Theater seasons 1 and 2 as Yui Ōtsuki (eps 13, 15)
Sylvanian Families Mini Stories

2018
Darling in the Franxx as Miku
The Idolmaster Cinderella Girls Theater season 3 as Yui Ōtsuki (ep 9)
Doraemon
Bakumatsu
Puzzle x Dragons as Honoka Himeno

2019
The Idolmaster Cinderella Girls Theater Climax Season as Yui Ōtsuki (eps 5, 10)
Cinderella Nine as Yoshimi Iwaki
If It's for My Daughter, I'd Even Defeat a Demon Lord as Rudy's Sister (ep 6)
Demon Slayer: Kimetsu no Yaiba as Kiyo Terauchi

2020
22/7 as Girl (ep 7)
In/Spectre as Girl A (ep 11)
Kiratto Pri Chan as KiracCHU
Dropkick on My Devil! Dash as Kyon-Kyon
GaruGaku as A.I Youka
Mr. Osomatsu 3 as Nyaa Hashimoto, Girl (ep 25)
A Certain Scientific Railgun T as Okawachi (ep 17)
Grand Blues! as Sahli Lao (ep 5)

2021
Demon Slayer: Kimetsu no Yaiba - Entertainment District Arc as Kiyo Terauchi
Log Horizon: Destruction of the Round Table as Litka Mofur
Pretty All Friends Selection
Life Lessons with Uramichi Oniisan as Child (eps 1, 5–7)
Love Live! Superstar!!
Go! Go! Cook R'n as Komatsuzaka 8 Member

2023
TenPuru as Kurage Aoba

TBA
In Another World with My Smartphone 2nd Season as Sushie Ernea Ortlinde

Theatrical anime
2014
Wake Up, Girls! The Movie as Nanami Hisami

2015
Wake Up, Girls! Seishun no Kage as Nanami Hisami

2017
Trinity Seven: Eternal Library & Alchemic Girl as Master Liber

2018
Eiga Shimajirō: Mahō no Shima no Daibōken as Pokapom
Gekijōban PriPara: Minna de Kagayake! Kirarin Star Live! as Pepper Taiyō

2019
Mr. Osomatsu: The Movie as Nyaa Hashimoto
Trinity Seven: Heavens Library & Crimson Lord as Master Liber

2020
High School Fleet: The Movie as Tsugumi Yagi

Original video animation
High School Fleet as Tsumugi Yagi
Yuuna and the Haunted Hot Springs as Miria Katsuragi (ep 4)

Web anime
2014
Wake Up, Girls! ZOO as Nanami

2017
Pac-Store as Pacmary

2020
The Idolmaster Cinderella Girls Theater: Extra Stage as Yui Ōtsuki (ep 48)
Idol Land PriPara as Pepper Taiyō

Video games
2013
Wake Up Girls! Stage no Tenshi as Nanami Hisami

2014
Hacka Dokka~n!! as Hacka Doll #3

2015
The Idolmaster Cinderella Girls as Yui Ōtsuki
The Idolmaster Cinderella Girls: Starlight Stage as Yui Ōtsuki
Granblue Fantasy as Sahli Lao
Thousand Memories as Hacka Doll #3
School Fanfare as Ruri Mitsuno
Miracle Girl Festival as Nanami Hisami
Yurukami! as Konpira Uchiwa
Yōkai Momohime-tan! as Hacka Doll #3
Yome Collection as Mao, Hacka Doll #3
Brave Sword × Blaze Soul as Or-drag, Gin-Iro

2016
PriPara as Pepper Taiyō
Aikatsu! as Hazuki Aranada
Enkan no Pandemica code -S- as Chizuru Ryūzen
Ore Tower -Over Legend Endless Tower- as Kihō-kan Suijungi
Quiz RPG: The World of Mystic Wiz as Felch Lily, Floria Lily
Gothic wa Mahō Otome ~Sassato Keiyaku Shinasai!~ as Hacka Doll #3
Shutsugeki! Shiritsu Ebisu Chūgaku Busō Jajjimento-kai as Sachiko Hachino
Soul Reverse Zero as Luce, Sibyl, Echo, Sei Shōnagon
Dragon Genesis Seisen no Kizuna as Kushinada-Hime
Trickster Online as Hacka Doll #3
Venus Eleven Vivid! as Hacka Doll #3

2017
Cinderella Nine as Yoshimi Iwaki
Monmusu Harem as Kosui Aiba, Hacka Doll #3, Hacka Doll #3 Ver.CS
Buki yo Saraba as Yuzu

2018
Vampire†Blood as Renka Yakage
Little Witch Academia: Chamber of Time as Balsa McVinegar
PriPara: All Idol Perfect Stage! as Pepper Taiyō
Vital Gear as Millefim, Elle
Onsen Musume Yunohana Collection as Arisa Kinosaki
Wake Up, Girls! Shinsei no Tenshi as Nanami Hisami
Digimon Realize as Lopmon
Tsukiakari -Luster- as Hyōma-shi, Tsukikage
Megido 72 as Imp, Grimalkin
Maplus+Kanojo as Kaori Yūki
Death End Request as Alice
Tokimeki Idol as Akane Tachikawa
Crusader Attack as Anna, Automaton Orca
Shiro Project:RE as Nihonmatsu Castle, Hitoyoshi Castle

2019
8 beat Story♪ as Ayame Tachibana (second voice)
High School Fleet: Kantai Battle de Pinch! as Tsumugi Yagi
MapleStory 2 as priest
Caravan Stories as Akari
Shirohime Quest as Heian Castle, Akita Castle
Mistover as Grim Reaper
Nijiiro Live as Rena
Shachibato! President, It's Time for Battle! as Serena Turtim
Touhou Cannonball

2020
Final Fantasy Brave Exvius as Poppy
Destiny Child as Serket
Mitra Sphere as Mitra Pink, Cheerleader
Shadowverse as Yui Ōtsuki, Shinobi Tanuki, Magical Shooter, Trinity Monsters
Kiratto Pri Chan as KiracCHU
Kōya no Kotobuki Hikōtai - Ōzora no Take Off Girls! as Nora
Last Origin as Scissors Rize, T-10 Nymph, T-60 Bulgasari, Magical BaekTo
Final Girl: Jūsō Senki as Sweetie
TABE-O-JA as Belze
Sakura Kakumei ~Hana Saku Otome-tachi~ as Shizuru Akiyoshi

2021
Hyakka Ryōran: Passion World as Katakura Kojūrō
Maglam Loaf as Ririka
Tantei Bokumetsu as Literary Detective
Waccha Primagi! as Player voice (soft type)
Demon Slayer: Kimetsu no Yaiba – The Hinokami Chronicles as Kiyo Terauchi

2022
Ajin Ōjo to Ryūjin Eiyū: Mitra Sphere as Cheerleader
KonoSuba: Fantastic Days as Lolisa
Goddess of Victory: Nikke as Yulha

Drama CD
2014
Chanopu! Drama ~Yotsuba's Hobby Search feat. Meiko & Nanase Explosion Women's Conference!!~ as Namika

2016
Idolmaster Cinderella Girls "Challenges to change" as Yui Ōtsuki

2017
Idolmaster Cinderella Girls: Wild Wind Girl as Yui Ōtsuki
Kujibiki Tokushō: Musō Harem-ken as Hikari

2018
Kono Orokamono ni mo Kyakkō o! as Loli Succubus

2019
In Another World With My Smartphone as Sushie Ernea Ortlinde

Audio drama
2016
Rajidora! Yoru no Drama House: "Embarrassing and cuddly things"
Karada Sagashi as Rumiko Hiiragi
Byebye Jinrui as Yoriko Koguma

2018
Cheat o Tsukureru no wa Ore Dake ~Munōryoku Dakedo Sekai Saikyō~ as Inori

Digital Comic
2019
Kyōdai Nanka ja Iranai as Mahiru Suzukaze

2021
Ao no Iris as Airi Nijigahara
Genjitsu mo Tamani wa Uso wo Tsuku as Nanami

Audio Book
2015
Shōsetsu-ban Wake Up, Girls! Sorezore no Sugata as Nanami Hisami

2020
Strikefall as Adele Conte
Mahō Shōjo-san da Ime ☆ as Mankai

2021
Tsukumo no Sora Kasa as Ayano
Ore to Kanojo no Koi o Chōnōryoku ga Jama Shite Iru. as Koharu Haijima
Vampire Tantei -Kindan no Unmei no Chi- as Hikaru Torahime
Sōchi no Bohimei as Hitsugi

2022
Zenryaku, Koroshiya Café de Hataraku Koto ni Narimashita. as Fuyara

Dubbing 
Thomas and Friends : All Engines Go as Sandy

Discography

Character Songs

References

External links

1995 births
Living people
Japanese women pop singers
Japanese video game actresses
Japanese voice actresses
Voice actresses from Tokushima Prefecture
21st-century Japanese actresses
21st-century Japanese singers
21st-century Japanese women singers